Salus University is a private university in Elkins Park, Pennsylvania, specializing in degree programs for the health care professions.

History
The university's founding college, the Pennsylvania College of Optometry (PCO), which was founded as the Pennsylvania State College of Optometry (PSCO) in 1919, is one of the oldest optometry colleges in North America. The decision to establish the college was reached at an annual conference of the Pennsylvania Optical Society in 1918. PCO was the first school in the U.S. to confer the legislature-approved Doctor of Optometry (OD) degree after its four-year educational program.

In 1975, PCO was the first college of optometry to develop a comprehensive, off-campus externship program. Later that year, the college began construction on its main clinical facility, The Eye Institute (TEI), which opened in 1978 to serve as a training site for the school's optometry students and as a community vision care center for the public. At the time of its opening, this was the first interdisciplinary clinical facility at an optometry school centered around patient care with graduate students. Presently, TEI has two locations with the main clinical facility in West Oak Lane and a satellite location in Chestnut Hill.

In 2000, PCO became the first school of optometry in the county to offer a Doctor of Audiology (AuD) degree when it received approval by the Commonwealth of Pennsylvania. By 2003, PCO had created a distance education program for licensed and practicing audiologists called AuD online and was finalizing construction of a new building to be used by students enrolled in the AuD curriculum by their commencement. The Pennsylvania Ear Institute (PEI), the clinical facility of the program, was opened on November 19, 2004, shortly before the school's first class of AuD students would begin their four-year curriculum. As of 2017, Salus alumni comprise more than 23 percent of all audiologists in the U.S.

The change in name from PCO to Salus University occurred on July 1, 2008. The name Salus, a Latin word for health and well-being, was unanimously chosen by the university board of trustees as "an expression of the institution's dedication to the preservation of the health and well-being of the communities its graduates serve." At this time, the university's College of Audiology was also renamed to the George S. Osborne College of Audiology (OCA) in the memory of Dr. Osborne who was a key individual in the development of the AuD degree program as well as dean of OCA. Over the years, the university has added programs such as Physician Assistant Studies (PA), Occupational Therapy (OT), Biomedicine and Speech-Language Pathology (SLP). In 2015, the Speech-Language Institute (SLI) opened as the clinical facility for the university's SLP program. 

The university currently consists of three colleges: Pennsylvania College of Optometry; Osborne College of Audiology; and the College of Health Sciences, Education and Rehabilitation.

Clinical facilities

Optometry 
The Eye Institute (TEI) was established in 1978 in the West Oak Lane section of Philadelphia, and in 2010 completed renovation. In addition to its main West Oak Lane clinical facility, TEI has a satellite location in the Chestnut Hill section of Philadelphia.

Audiology 
Established in 2004, Pennsylvania Ear Institute (PEI) is located at the school’s Elkins Park campus in Pennsylvania and serves as a clinical site for Doctor of Audiology (AuD) students enrolled in the Osborne College of Audiology (OCA).

Speech-Language Pathology 
The Speech-Language Institute (SLI) is the clinical facility for students enrolled in the University's Speech-Language Pathology (SLP) master's degree program. The Institute opened in July 2015 at the University's main campus in Elkins Park, Pennsylvania.

Occupational Therapy 
The Occupational Therapy Institute (OTI) was opened Spring 2021 in West Oak Lane in Philadelphia, within The Eye Institute of Salus University. It is a clinical facility for students enrolled in the University's Occupational Therapy (OT) master's degree program.

References

External links
 Official website

Optometry schools in the United States
Educational institutions established in 1919
Universities and colleges in Montgomery County, Pennsylvania
1919 establishments in Pennsylvania
Elkins Park, Pennsylvania
Private universities and colleges in Pennsylvania